Prima Donna (stylized as PRIMA DONNA) is the debut and only studio album by South Korean girl group Nine Muses, released on October 14, 2013 through Star Empire Entertainment. A majority of the album's production is by Han Jae-ho and Kim Seung-soo, also known as Sweetune, who have worked with the group since their 2011 single "Figaro".

In September 2013, the group announced that they will be starting a new promotional cycle with their first full-length album after the chuseok holidays. The album's track list was revealed on September 26, 2013. Various teaser images and jacket photos for Prima Donna were released in the first week of October, along with an audio preview of all eleven tracks on October 9, 2013. The album debuted at number seven on the Gaon Albums Chart.

Prima Donna'''s lead track, "Gun", contains retro influences with a western beat, featuring a  brass and blues feel with an electronic guitar. The single charted on the Gaon charts at number sixteen.

Background
In September 2013, a Star Empire Entertainment official stated that ZE:A's label-mates Nine Muses would start promotions in the second half of the year. The group confirmed this in an interview with Star News, where member Hyuna shared that they recently shot the album cover and are currently practicing their choreography, with this year's chuseok being "more of a period of preparation for our album rather than a holiday". Minha said that the album will have songs they haven't tried before, and as there are many tracks, the nine members "fused their individual charms to become one".

The album's name and release date was revealed a week later on September 26, 2013, along with a track list of eleven songs.

Singles
"Gun" was promoted as the lead single from Prima Donna. It was produced by Han Jae-ho and Kim Seung-soo with lyrics by Song Soo-yun. Featuring "sixties guitar riffs" and "jazzy horns", the song has been compared to Rainbow's 2010 single "A". A three-second preview of "Gun" can be heard at the end of a mash-up of the group's past singles, released onto YouTube on September 30, 2013. A teaser of the song's official music video was released on October 7, 2013, which featured the album's title track. Nine Muses began promoting the single on Korea's televised music shows a few days later, performing "Gun" for the first time on the October 11, 2013, broadcast of Mnet's M! Countdown''. The official music video for "Gun" premiered on October 14, 2013, which was filmed at a sandy, deserted location with a reed forest; featuring a gas station set. Member Lee Sem said that she "felt like [she] was filming a movie".

Track listing

Charts

Album chart

Sales

Release history

References

External links
 

2013 debut albums
Nine Muses (band) albums
Korean-language albums
Kakao M albums